Sebastiania pusilla is a species of flowering plant in the family Euphorbiaceae. It was described in 1945. It is native to Uruguay.

References

Plants described in 1945
Flora of Uruguay
pusilla
Taxa named by Léon Croizat